Orthogonius buqueti is a species of ground beetle in the subfamily Orthogoniinae. It was described by Maximilien Chaudoir in 1850.

References

buqueti
Beetles described in 1850